SH3BP2 (SH3 domain-binding protein 2) is a protein that comes from a gene located on Chromosome 4. SH3BP2 binds differentially to the SH3 domains of certain proteins of signal transduction pathways. It binds to phosphatidylinositols linking the hemopoietic tyrosine kinase fes to the cytoplasmic membrane in a phosphorylation dependent mechanism. It is also associated with cherubism.

See also
 SH3 domain

External links
 GeneReviews/NCBI/NIH/UW entry on Cherubism
 
 Genetics Home Reference on SH3BP2